Atelodora agramma is a species of moth of the family Tortricidae. It is found in Australia, where it has been recorded from South Australia.

References

Archipini
Moths described in 1900
Moths of Australia
Taxa named by Oswald Bertram Lower